Environmental Protection Act or Environment Protection Act may refer to:

Australia
 Environmental Protection Act 1986, which governs the Environmental Protection Authority of Western Australia
Environment Protection Act 1993 in South Australia
Environment Protection and Biodiversity Conservation Act 1999, known as the EPBC Act, in Australia

Other countries
Canadian Environmental Protection Act, 1999
Environmental Protection Act 1990 in the United Kingdom

See also
Environmental protection
Environment Act (disambiguation)